The Schwarzlose Model 1908 was a semi-automatic pistol, designed by Andreas Schwarzlose, released in 1908 in the German Empire and produced until 1911.

Operation 

The Schwarzlose employs a very distinctive "blow-forward action" operating mechanism.  It has no slide, instead the mechanism is operated by the barrel being projected forward due to the gas pressure and the friction of the bullet passing through the bore, the compressed recoil spring drives the barrel back, stripping the top cartridge from the magazine, chambering the round, and pressing the cartridge head against the standing breech, which is part of the frame.

See also 

 Hino Komuro M1908 Pistol
 Schwarzlose MG M.07/12
 Steyr Mannlicher M1894

References

External links 

 Archive.org
 Hunt 101.com
 Hunt 101.com
 Hunt 101.com
 Hunt 101.com

.32 ACP semi-automatic pistols
Blow forward firearms
Semi-automatic pistols 1901–1909
Semi-automatic pistols of Germany
Weapons and ammunition introduced in 1908